Below The Belt is a remix album released by Pigface in 1998. The album is a companion piece to the A New High in Low LP and features remixes by artists such as Tranquility Bass, Justin Broadrick, Mick Harris, Scanner, Sheep on Drugs, and Hanzel und Gretyl.

Track listing

References 

1998 remix albums
Pigface albums